The Law of Success is a book written by Napoleon Hill in 1925.

It was originally released as a set of 15 separate booklets before being consolidated into a single-tome book. There were 118 limited edition copies, which were given to many of America's most successful individuals, all of whom had contributed to the content of the book. Orne Publishing used one of these original copies to create a reprinted version of The Law of Success in 2010.

The Law of Success in 16 Lessons is an edited version of Napoleon Hill’s first manuscript, which was reworked under the advisement of several contributors. This version was initially published in 1928 as a multi-volume correspondence course. Later editions consolidated the material into a single hardcover book.

History

According to Hill, the work was commissioned at the request of Andrew Carnegie, at the conclusion of a multi-day interview with Hill. It was allegedly based upon interviews with over 100 American millionaires, including self-made industrial giants such as Henry Ford, J. P. Morgan, John D. Rockefeller, Alexander Graham Bell and Thomas Edison, across nearly 20 years. The Law of Success was first presented as a lecture, and was delivered by its author in many major cities and in many smaller localities throughout the United States over a period of more than seven years.

Inc.
magazine included this among the "14 Great Books for Anyone Who Wants Get Ahead in Life"

The "Master Mind" concept introduced in the first chapter of this first book is regarded to be the key behind Hill's system by some authors. A Mastermind group is specified as a peer-to-peer mentoring group to help members solve their problems with input from the other group members.

Themes

Hill frequently refers to 'The Temple of Success,' and cites the laws and their collective understanding to be the door to the Temple of Success. It is the author's stance that thinking is the most organized form of energy. The 16 lessons include The Law of the Mastermind,
A Definite Chief Aim,
Self-Confidence,
Habit of Saving,
Initiative and Leadership,
Imagination,
Enthusiasm,
Self-Control,
Doing More than Paid For,
A Pleasing Personality,
Accurate Thinking,
Concentration,
Cooperation,
Profiting by Failure,
Tolerance,
and The Golden Rule.

References 

Self-help books
Business books
1928 non-fiction books